This is an incomplete list of 2,700 species of vascular plants which are native to the region of Palestine as 
defined by Flora Palaestina.Flora Palaestina is a work in four volumes published  by  Brill Academic Publishers between 1966 and 1986,  edited by Michael Zohary and Naomi Feinbrun-Dothan.  The region covered includes the whole area of the State of Israel, the West Bank, the Gaza Strip, the Golan Heights, 
the Israeli-occupied part of Mount Hermon, and the East Bank (which is in Jordan).

The table below lists alphabetically all species with initial letters E–O. See the following for other species and some background information:
A–B
C–D
P–Z

Notes

 03
Palestine03
Plants03